Vasyl Panasovych Holol-Yanovsky (1777 – 31 March (11 April) 1825) also known as Vasily Gogol-Yanovsky was an author of a number of theater pieces in Russian and in Ukrainian and father of the writer Nikolai Gogol. He was the landlord of the village of Vasilyevka (now Hoholeve), Poltava oblast and descendant of Ukrainian Cossack noble families of Hohol and Lizogub.

Vasily Hogol-Yanovsky loved writing comedic stage plays in Russian as well as in Ukrainian, which were successfully put on by the famous theatre patron Dmitry Troshchinsky.

Biography 
Vasily was a son of Opanas Demianovych Hohol-Yanovsky (1739–1798) and Tatyana Semenivna Lizohub (1760–1826).

According to legend, one ancestor, Ostap Hohol, was famous as a Cossack colonel and Hetman of Right-Bank Ukraine. His grandfather and great grandfather were Orthodox priests. He attended the Poltava Theological Seminary and was a member of the Zaporizhian Army.

Having spent some time at the post service, Vasyl left in 1805, with the rank of Collegiate Assessor and retired to his own estate Vasilyevka (Yanovshchina) to devote himself to farming.

Vasily Gogol-Yanovsky was a friend of Dmitry Prokofyevich Troshchinsky, Minister of the State Council, and a distant relative. Vasily Afanasyevich was the director and actor in the Troshchinsky Home Theater between 1812 and 1825. In this capacity, he wrote several musical comedies based upon Ukrainian culture and folklore. Vasily Gogol-Yanovsky also wrote poems in the Russian and Ukrainian languages. Alexander Danilevsky noted that Vasily was a "matchless storyteller".

Works 
  Собака-Вивця // Записки о жизни Н. В. Гоголя. V. 1. – 1856. – pp. 15–16.
  Простакъ, или хитрость женщины, перехитренная солдатомъ // Osnova. – 1862. – # 2. – pp. 19–43.

References

External links
 "For Fools, or The Cunning Woman" by Vasyl Gogol-Yanovsky
 Hohol-Yanovsky, Vasyl Encyclopedia of Ukraine (Toronto)

1777 births
1825 deaths
Nikolai Gogol
Lyzohub family
Ukrainian nobility
Ukrainian dramatists and playwrights
Ukrainian poets
Ukrainian landlords
19th-century landowners